Arena Nova is an indoor multi-purpose stadium located in Wiener Neustadt, Austria. The arena has an overall seating capacity of approximately 5,000.

This is the biggest event arena in Lower Austria, and it is used to hold sporting events, exhibitions and concerts.

History
It was the venue for the Final of the 1995 World Women's Handball Championship, and will once again be one of the venues during the 2010 European Men's Handball Championship.

In 1999 the arena won the Bronze Medal at the IOC/IAKS Award.

See also 
 List of indoor arenas in Austria

References

External links 

Sports venues in Austria
Indoor arenas in Austria
Handball venues in Austria
Sports venues in Lower Austria
Wiener Neustadt